Hans Antonius Faverey (14 September 1933, in Paramaribo – 8 July 1990, in Amsterdam) was a Dutch poet of Surinam descent. Besides being a poet, he was a lecturer at the psychology department of the Universiteit Leiden.

Biography
Faverey was born in Suriname, but moved to the Netherlands in 1939 where he graduated from the University of Amsterdam, and was a psychologist by profession. In 1959 he married the poet Lela Zeckovic, and in 1965 started to work at the University of Leiden as a lecturer.

Career
Faverey's poetry is thought of as dense and difficult, though Favery usually laughed at such remarks, saying that it really is not that hard. His first two collections were poorly received and only few critics praised them; nevertheless, he received the Poetry Award from the city of Amsterdam for his debut, Gedichten ("Poems").
 
In 1977, Faverey published Chrysanten, Roeiers for which he was awarded the Jan Campert Prize.
From then on Faverey quickly became accepted and canonized. The number of critical studies of his work increases—to the point where Faverey seems to be on a par with Gerrit Kouwenaar and Lucebert. He is buried at Zorgvlied cemetery.

Honors and awards
 1969 - Amsterdam Poetry Award for Gedichten
 1977 - Jan Campert Award for Chrysanten, roeiers
 1990 - Constantijn Huygens Prize for his entire oeuvre

Bibliography
 1968 - Gedichten
 1972 - Gedichten 2
 1977 - Chrysanten, roeiers
 1978 - Lichtval
 1980 - Gedichten
 1983 - Zijden Kettingen
 1985 - Hinderlijke goden
 1988 - Tegen het vergeten
 1990 - Het ontbrokene
 1993 - Verzamelde gedichten
 2000 - Springvossen

References

External links 
Hans Faverey at the Digital library for Dutch literature (in Dutch - Chrysanten, Roeiers available for free download)

1933 births
1990 deaths
Dutch male poets
Surinamese poets
People from Paramaribo
Writers from Amsterdam
Constantijn Huygens Prize winners
20th-century Dutch poets
20th-century Dutch male writers